Loker (also spelt Locre ) is a small village in the Belgian province of West Flanders, and a part ("deelgemeente") of the municipality of Heuvelland.

For the major part of World War I, the city was controlled by the Allied Powers. A field hospital was located there and multiple war graves can also be found.

Gallery

References

Populated places in West Flanders
Heuvelland